"To Hell & Back" is a song recorded by American country music singer Maren Morris. It was released on March 30, 2020 as the third single from her second studio album Girl.  Morris wrote the song along with Jessie Jo Dillon and Laura Veltz.

Content
“To Hell and Back,” is an acceptance song about loving a person for their entire journey -- not just what they appear to be in the here and now. Simultaneously is also a love letter to her husband, Ryan Hurd.

Live performance
On September 16, 2020, Morris performed the song "To Hell & Back" during the 2020 ACM Awards at Nashville's Ryman Auditorium.

Besides, on October 21, 2020, Morris and Brandi Carlile performed "To Hell & Back" at the 2020 CMT Music Awards.

Charts
The song peaked at number 32 on the Country Airplay chart, becoming Morris' lowest-charting single to date, and her first single to miss the top 20.

Weekly charts

Year-end charts

References

2020 songs
Maren Morris songs
Songs written by Maren Morris
Songs written by Laura Veltz
Songs written by Jessie Jo Dillon
Song recordings produced by busbee
Columbia Nashville Records singles